Samarra Stadium, is a multi-use stadium in Samarra, Iraq.  It is currently used mostly for football matches and serves as the home stadium of Samaraa FC. The stadium holds 8,000 people.

See also 
List of football stadiums in Iraq

References

Football venues in Iraq